"The Groove" is a song by American jazz pianist Rodney Franklin released as a single in April 1980 from his second album You'll Never Know.

"The Groove" had the most success in the UK, peaking at number 7 on the Singles Chart, and even created its own dance craze there, called 'The Freeze', started by disc jockey Chris Hill, in which due to the number of breaks in the song, dancers would freeze until the music started again.

Track listing
7": Columbia / 1-11252
 "The Groove" – 3:28
 "God Bless the Blues" – 3:01

12": Columbia / 43-11300
 "The Groove" – 4:48
 "God Bless the Blues" – 6:22

12": CBS / S CBS 13 8529 (UK and Europe)
 "The Groove" – 4:48
 "God Bless the Blues" – 3:01

Personnel
Musicians
 Rodney Franklin – piano
 Brooks Hunnicutt – vocals
 Lisa Roberts – vocals
 Phyllis St. James – vocals
 Vince Spaulding – electric guitar
 Harold Foreman – bass guitar
 Dean Holzkamp – flute, soprano saxophone
 Tony St. Junior – drums
 Kenneth Nash – percussion

Technical
 Paul Buckmaster – producer
 Rodney Franklin – associate producer
 George Butler – executive producer
 Mark Needham – recording engineer
 Don Hahn – remix engineer
 Bernie Grundman – mastering engineer

Charts

References

1980 singles
1980 songs
Columbia Records singles
CBS Records singles